Katharina Elisabeth Schulze (born 20 June 1985) is a German politician of Alliance 90/The Greens who has been serving as a member of the State Parliament of Bavaria (Landtag) since 2013. Along with Ludwig Hartmann, she was one of the two leading candidates of her party in the 2018 Bavarian state election. Since 2019, she has been part of her party's national leadership, under co-chairs Annalena Baerbock and Robert Habeck.

Early life and education 
Schulze was born in Freiburg and grew up in Herrsching am Ammersee. Ahead of the 2008 United States presidential election, she was a volunteer for the campaign of the Democratic Party's candidate Barack Obama in Michigan.

Political career 
From 2010 to 2015, Schulze served as chairwoman of the Green Party in Munich.

Schulze has been a member of the Landtag of Bavaria since the 2013 elections, representing Upper Bavaria. She has been serving as her parliamentary group's chair since 2017, succeeding Margarete Bause. In addition, she has been a member of the Committee on Legal Affairs (2015–2017) and the Committee on Municipal Affairs and Security (since 2013).

Other activities 
 Bavarian School of Public Policy (HfP), Member of the Advisory Board (2015–2018)

Political positions 
In 2010, Schulze opposed Munich's bid for the 2018 Winter Olympics.

Personal life 
Schulze has been in a relationship with fellow Green Party politician Danyal Bayaz since 2019. In 2021, the couple's son was born.

References 

Living people
1985 births
Members of the Landtag of Bavaria
Alliance 90/The Greens politicians